Mohammad Zahir (born 20 January 1997) is an Afghan cricketer. He made his first-class debut for Band-e-Amir Region in the 2017–18 Ahmad Shah Abdali 4-day Tournament on 1 November 2017. Prior to his first-class debut, he was named in Afghanistan's squad for the 2016 Under-19 Cricket World Cup. He made his List A debut for Logar Province in the 2019 Afghanistan Provincial Challenge Cup tournament on 1 August 2019.

References

External links
 

1997 births
Living people
Afghan cricketers
Band-e-Amir Dragons cricketers
Kabul Eagles cricketers
Place of birth missing (living people)